"Hollow Man" is the fourth track and second single from R.E.M.'s fourteenth album Accelerate. The music video was created by Crush Inc., a graphic-design and production studio based in Toronto, and posted on the band's website on April 23, 2008. The single was released in the UK on June 2, 2008. The song peaked at number 7 on Billboard magazine's Triple A chart.

Track listing
CD single (UK, W804CD1)
"Hollow Man" – 2:42
"Horse to Water" (Live in Vancouver) – 2:38

The CD cover shows a typical Nokia mobile phone interface.

Canceled release
This three-track single was scheduled as a CD single in Germany but was subsequently canceled. The B-side "Indian Summer" is however available through download stores. Some three-track copies of the CD single were released as promotional copies. These are extremely rare and were not available in stores.
"Hollow Man" – 2:42
"Horse to Water" (Live in Vancouver) – 2:38
"Indian Summer" – 5:01

Personnel
"Hollow Man" and "Horse to Water" written by Peter Buck, Mike Mills and Michael Stipe.
"Indian Summer" written by Calvin Johnson (Beat Happening cover, from their album Jamboree, 1988).

Music video
The music video for the song features a four-frame animated figure overlaid on top of the footage. At Hollowman.tv, the band have encouraged fans to print off copies of the character and photograph it themselves to insert on the video projected behind their live performances of the song.

Charts

References

External links
Music video
Hollow Man site

2008 singles
R.E.M. songs
Songs written by Peter Buck
Songs written by Mike Mills
Songs written by Michael Stipe
Warner Records singles
Song recordings produced by Jacknife Lee
Song recordings produced by Michael Stipe
Song recordings produced by Peter Buck
Song recordings produced by Mike Mills
2008 songs